Rodange is a town in the commune of Pétange, in south-western Luxembourg.  It lies next to the border with Belgium, across which is the town of Athus.  The town is to the south-west of the town of Pétange and to the west of the smaller town of Lamadelaine.  , Rodange has a population of 5,505, making it the 18th-most populous town in Luxembourg.

The town has a railway station served by CFL trains.  Rodange is situated on Line 70, which connects the south-west of the country to Luxembourg City; at Rodange, the line branches, and connects to both Athus and the French town of Longuyon (via Longwy).

Steel works

The steelworks in Rodange was founded in 1872. After numerous mergers and restructuring as of 2010 the plant now produces mainly long steel products, and is now part of the ArcelorMittal Rodange & Schifflange S.A, a division of ArcelorMittal.

References

Pétange
Towns in Luxembourg
Belgium–Luxembourg border crossings